Liquore Strega is an Italian herbal liqueur produced since 1860 by the S. A. Distilleria Liquore Strega in Benevento, Italy. Its distinctive yellow color comes from the presence of saffron. Strega is bottled at 80 proof (40% ABV), which is an alcohol content comparable to most hard liquors, but it has a sweetness and viscosity typical of liqueurs. Among its approximately 70 herbal ingredients are mint and fennel, giving it a complex flavor with minty and coniferous notes.

Strega is considered a digestif. It is used for flavoring torta caprese, a type of cake.

History 

Strega was developed in 1860 by the father–son team of Carmine Vincenzo Alberti and Giuseppe Alberti. The company experienced growth until Giuseppe Alberti's death in 1894. Alberti's four sons Ugo, Vincenzo, Francesco and Luigi took control. The company received a royal warrant of appointment to the Italian King.

Strega became well known for its colourful and artistic advertising. One poster was designed in 1906 by in the art nouveau style. Strega is the Italian word for "witch" and since legends of witchcraft at Benevento date back to the time of the Lombard invasion, it was a natural choice of name for the liqueur.

Recipe 
The production process begins with the milling of about 70 herbs and spices, characterized by special aromatic properties, imported from all over the world and selected with great skill. Among them we can mention: the cinnamon of Ceylon, the Iride Fiorentino, the juniper of the Italian Apennines, the mint of Sannio, which grows spontaneously along the rivers of the region. Its characteristic yellow color comes from the addition of the precious saffron to the distillate of aromatic herbs. The liqueur Strega, is aged for a long time in oak tanks in order to assimilate an expressive breadth and elegance of the bouquet as an expression of many different aromas originating a liqueur obtained by distillation of the aromatic component, from the alcohol content of 40% vol. It is only after completion of this maturation that the liqueur is bottled and distributed throughout the world.

Strega Prize 
The Premio Strega (Strega Prize) is the most important Italian literary award. It was founded in 1947 by Guido Alberti, then owner of the company, together with his friends the writer Maria Bellonci and her husband Goffredo. Its origins lie with a group of post-World War II Italian writers, intellectuals and artists known as the “Sunday Friends” (“Amici della Domenica”). Goffredo and Maria Bellonci hosted the Sunday Friends at their home with the intention of stimulating an active debate in Italian cultural life. In 1947, Bellonci set up a literary prize for the best work of prose fiction, to be decided upon by the votes of the Sunday Friends. The name of the Prize came from the company that produces Strega liqueur, which offered the money for the prize.

Awards 
The San Francisco World Spirits Competition, one of several international spirit ratings organizations, has evaluated Strega liqueur on three occasions since 2005. The ratings organization gave the spirit gold medals in 2005 and 2011 and a silver medal in 2008.

References

External links

Italian liqueurs
Herbal liqueurs
Italian Royal Warrant holders